Phir Dhoom is an album by Indian band Euphoria.

Track listing
"Phir Dhoom"
"Hum"
"Satyamev Jayate"
"Aao Na"
"Aasaan"
"Gham-e-Rooh"
"Ek]"
"Mujse Kaha Na Gaya"
"New Millennium "
"Pyaar Hi Thaa"
"Maaeri"
"Me and You"

External links
Phir Dhoom website

2000 albums
Euphoria (Indian band) albums